The 2024 Alaska Republican presidential caucuses will be held on March 5, 2024, as part of the Republican Party primaries for the 2024 presidential election. 28 delegates to the 2024 Republican National Convention will be allocated on a proportional basis. The contest will be held on Super Tuesday alongside primaries in 14 other states.

Background 
In the 2016 Republican presidential contest, Senator Ted Cruz won the Alaska caucuses with 36.4% of the vote, while Donald Trump followed closely with 33.6% of the vote. In the 2020 primaries, the Alaska Republican Party canceled their caucuses on the basis that Trump was the incumbent and "a PPP [presidential preference poll] need not be conducted."

Candidates 
Former president Donald Trump and former South Carolina governor and U.S. Ambassador to the United Nations Nikki Haley are the only main contenders to officially announce their candidacy so far, although Florida governor Ron DeSantis is widely expected to announce his candidacy as soon as May 2023.

Endorsements

See also 
 2024 Republican Party presidential primaries
 2024 United States presidential election
 2024 United States presidential election in Alaska
 2024 United States elections

References 

Republican presidential primary
Alaska
Alaska Republican caucuses